Route 40, also known as the Mount Carmel Connector, is a  spur route from Interstate 91 (at Exit 10) in North Haven, Connecticut connecting I-91 and Bailey Road in North Haven to Route 10 in the Mount Carmel neighborhood of Hamden. Route 40 is a 4-lane freeway with one intermediate exit leading to / from U.S. Route 5 in North Haven.  It crosses over Route 15 (Wilbur Cross Parkway) but does not have an interchange with it. This is the only place in the state where two freeways cross without an interchange.

Route description

Route 40 begins from northbound I-91 in North Haven as the exit 10 off-ramp. The designation runs for  along the exit ramp. The expressway then proceeds northwest and is joined by on-ramps from Bailey Road and southbound I-91. The I-91 interchange includes an overpass over the Quinnipiac River and railroad tracks. About  past the I-91 interchange, the road crosses over another set of railroad tracks, then has an interchange with U.S. Route 5. Access to and from US 5 is via Dixwell Avenue (SR 717) or Devine Street (SR 720). The road soon enters the town of Hamden, where it crosses over the Mill River and closely parallels Route 22 for the rest of its alignment. Route 40 ends at the traffic lights with northbound Whitney Avenue (Route 10). At that intersection it also, down the road, junctions up with CT Route 22, no trucks on both east and west routes.

Route 40 in Hamden is also known as the Edward Armeno Memorial Highway, named after a Hamden police officer.

History
Plans for the Mount Carmel Connector first appeared in Tri-State Transportation Commission's recommendations of 1962. This was not acted upon for several years until the Connecticut Highway Department put up the proposal again in 1967. Originally the Mount Carmel Connector was to be part of the expressway relocation of Route 10 to exit 29 of I-84 in Southington. These plans were never implemented, however.

The Mount Carmel Connector was opened in 1972 from I-91 to Dixwell Avenue and State Street (US 5) in North Haven. It was first given an unsigned designation of State Road 724. The expressway was extended north to Whitney Avenue (Route 10) in Hamden in 1976, at which time it was given the designation Route 40. Originally, Route 40 was planned to extend further southeast beyond I-91 to connect with I-95 in Branford.

Exit list

Exit numbers on CT Route 40 will be switched from sequential to mile-based as part of a sign and structural supports replacement project that will start in August 2021.

References

External links

 Connecticut State Highway Log
 New York Roads, Connecticut Route 10
 Connecticut Roads, Route 40
 CT 40 (Greater New York Roads)

040
Transportation in New Haven County, Connecticut
Freeways in the United States
North Haven, Connecticut
Hamden, Connecticut